The Pietroasa is a right tributary of the river Sărata in Romania. It flows into the Sărata near Movila Banului.

References

Rivers of Romania
Rivers of Buzău County